Thurman Charles Crook (July 18, 1891 – October 23, 1981) was an American educator, farmer, and politician who served one term as a United States representative from Indiana from 1949 to 1951.

Biography 
Thurman Crook was born on a farm near Peru, Indiana and attended the Cass County schools, Logansport High School, Indiana State University, Purdue University, Indiana University, before graduating from Valparaiso University in 1930. He learned the carpentry and cement trades, and later taught departmental work and coached athletics in Indiana high schools from 1913 to 1948.

Crook wrote a book in 1928 called Mechanical Drawing, a Textbook for Beginners, which was published by the McGraw-Hill book company.

He was a fruit grower near Logansport, Indiana from 1924 to 1947.

Political career 
Crook was a member of the Indiana House of Representatives from 1939 to 1943, and then served in the Indiana Senate from 1943 to 1947.

He was an unsuccessful candidate for the Democratic nomination in 1946 to the Eightieth Congress. Crook was elected as a Democrat to the Eighty-first Congress (January 3, 1949 – January 3, 1951) but was an unsuccessful candidate for reelection in 1950 to the Eighty-second Congress. He was also an unsuccessful candidate for election in 1956 to the Eighty-fifth Congress.

Later career and death 
After leaving Congress, Crook worked as a farmer, horticulturist, and sheep raiser. He was a resident of Macy, Indiana until his death in Rochester, Indiana in 1981 at age 90.

References

Bibliography

1891 births
1981 deaths
Farmers from Indiana
American textbook writers
American male non-fiction writers
American horticulturists
Democratic Party members of the Indiana House of Representatives
People from Peru, Indiana
Indiana State University alumni
Valparaiso University alumni
Democratic Party Indiana state senators
Democratic Party members of the United States House of Representatives from Indiana
People from Cass County, Indiana
People from Miami County, Indiana
20th-century American politicians
20th-century American male writers
Educators from Indiana